CBOF-FM (90.7 MHz) is a non-commercial Canadian radio station located in Ottawa, Ontario. It airs a French language news/talk format, much of which comes from the Ici Radio-Canada Première network. The studios and offices are located at the CBC Ottawa Broadcast Centre on Queen Street (across from the Confederation Line light rail station) in Downtown Ottawa.

Owned and operated by the Canadian Broadcasting Corporation (French: Société Radio-Canada), CBOF-FM has an effective radiated power (ERP) of 84,000 watts as a class C1 station, using an omnidirectional antenna located off Chemin Dunlop in Camp Fortune, Quebec.

Programming
The station's current local programs are Les matins d'ici, heard weekday mornings from 5:30 a.m. to 9 a.m., and Sur le vif airing on weekday afternoons, 3 p.m. to 6 p.m. The early morning program from 5 a.m. to 5:30 a.m., Info matin, originates from CBF-FM Montreal and is also heard in Quebec City. CBOF-FM's Saturday morning local program is Les malins, heard from 7:00 a.m. to 11 a.m.

History
The station signed on in 1964 as CBOF.  It was originally on the AM band at 1250 kHz, with 10,000 watts day and night.  Before then, Radio-Canada relied on privately owned AM 970 CKCH in nearby Hull, Quebec, as well as the 50,000-watt signal of Montreal's AM 690 CBF, to serve Ottawa's francophones.

On January 15, 1975 the Canadian Radio-television and Telecommunications Commission (CRTC) approved the CBC's application to increase CBOF's signal from 10,000 watts to 50,000 watts day and night at 1250 kHz.  In the 1980s, the CBC made the decision to begin moving many of its English and French-language AM stations to the FM dial.

The CRTC approved the CBC's application to convert CBOF from the AM band to the FM band, on November 9, 1989.  CBOF moved to its current frequency on 90.7 MHz on January 7, 1991 as CBOF-FM.  After a period of simulcasting on both AM and FM, the AM transmitter was shutdown. Its sister station on 102.5, on the Radio-Canada Musique network, which used the CBOF-FM call sign before that date, is now known as CBOX-FM.

CBOF-FM, like all Première network stations but unlike most FM stations, broadcasts in mono.  While still on the AM dial, CBOF experimented with AM stereo broadcasts between 1984 and 1987, testing all four AM stereo systems (C-QUAM, Kahn-Hazeltine, Harris and Magnavox) proposed at the time.

Transmitters

The two AM repeaters in Rolphton, Ontario and Maniwaki, Quebec are the last two remaining CBOF repeaters that currently operate on the AM band. Plans are currently in place to convert the AM transmitters of CBOF-1 Maniwaki and CBOF-4 Rolphton to FM band. On March 17, 2022, the CBC submitted an application to move CBOF-1 Maniwaki from the AM band to the FM band at 94.3 MHz.  The CRTC approved the CBC's applications to move both CBOF-1 and CBOM Maniwaki to the FM band on June 1, 2022.  

On September 20, 2022, the CBC submitted an application to convert CBOF-4 Rolphton, Ontario from the AM band at 1400 kHz to the FM band at 98.5 MHz  which was approved on November 28, 2022.

Former repeaters
Former CBOF repeaters that have been silent since the 1980s and 1990s:
 Petawawa - CBOF-2 1240 AM
 Deep River - CBOF-3 730 AM
 Mattawa - CBOF-5 1090 AM - This was a former repeater of CBOF Ottawa  which still remains on the air (in 2022 at 1090 kHz) as CBON-12, a repeater of CBON-FM Sudbury
 Renfrew - CBOF-FM-8 98.7 - This was a former FM repeater in Renfrew, Ontario that was deleted when CBOF-FM signed on in Ottawa in the early 1990s. The 98.7 FM frequency is now currently occupied by CJHR-FM in Renfrew, while the two former AM frequencies that were used by CBOF as repeaters in Petawawa and Deep River were never reactivated for any other future broadcasting.

References

External links
Ici Radio-Canada Première
 

 (OLD frequency)

Bof
Bof
Bof
Radio stations established in 1964
1964 establishments in Ontario